An Inconvenient Book: Real Solutions to the World's Biggest Problems is a 2007 political narrative written and edited by conservative commentator Glenn Beck.

Explanation of the book's title
The title of An Inconvenient Book is a parody of the title of Al Gore's 2006 documentary An Inconvenient Truth. One section of the book provides a critical response to Gore's views on global warming.

Issues discussed
Beck discusses his political views on a number of subjects.  Issues include Beck’s claims that the free market provides the best way to fight global warming, divorce rates, Beck's perceptions of liberal bias on school campuses, the income gap, perceived anti-Americanism of the United Nations, and illegal immigration.

Reception
Publishers Weekly described An Inconvenient Book as "a good read for conservatives," referring to Beck's often lighthearted tone, "at his best when most absurd, and funniest when he's his own target."  On the content, the reviewer says "While often informative, as in his chapter on global warming, Beck is sometimes tedious, particularly when dealing with Islam and education (France is literally teetering on the edge, and our biggest ally, England, is about to be turned inside out as well)."

An Inconvenient Book entered The New York Times Best Seller List at Number 1 under the category Hardcover Nonfiction, and stayed in the list for 17 weeks.

References and quotations

External links
Glenn Beck's book page

2007 non-fiction books
2007 in the environment
American political books
Environmentally skeptical books
Books by Glenn Beck
Books critical of modern liberalism in the United States
Environmental non-fiction books
Non-fiction books about immigration to the United States